Dame Ivanov Stoykov (born 11 July 1966), also known as Dame Stoykov (Даме Стойков), is a Bulgarian judoka. He competed in the men's heavyweight event at the 1992 Summer Olympics.

Achievements

References

External links
 

1966 births
Living people
Bulgarian male judoka
Olympic judoka of Bulgaria
Judoka at the 1992 Summer Olympics
People from Gotse Delchev
Sportspeople from Blagoevgrad Province